Songs of Life from a Dying British Empire is a 1981 album by Leon Rosselson and Roy Bailey.

Track listing

1981 albums
Leon Rosselson albums
Roy Bailey (folk singer) albums